Eurasian landmass may refer to:

Eurasia, the combined landmass of Europe and Asia
Eurasian plate, the tectonic plate covering Eurasia
Euro-Asian Steppe, the vast steppe ecoregion of Eurasia